Byais (also spelled bya-is, biya-is, or biyais), is a traditional Filipino wine from the Mansaka people of Davao de Oro. It has a sharp flavor reminiscent of citrus fruits or pine needles.

See also
Bais
Kabarawan
Intus
Mead
Sima

References

Fermented drinks
Philippine alcoholic drinks
Philippine cuisine